The Master of Physical Education (M.P.Ed or MPhEd)  is a postgraduate academic degree in physical education awarded by universities.

Specialization
Sports Specialization curriculum.
 Athletics
 Gymnastics
 Team Game
 Individual game

See also
 Bachelor of Physical Education

References

Master's degrees
Physical education
Physical education in India